333 North Michigan is a skyscraper in the art deco style located in the Loop community area of Chicago, Illinois in the United States. Architecturally, it is noted for its dramatic upper-level setbacks that were inspired by the 1923 skyscraper zoning laws. Geographically, it is known as one of the four 1920s flanks of the Michigan Avenue Bridge (along with the Wrigley Building, Tribune Tower and the London Guarantee Building) that are contributing properties to the Michigan–Wacker Historic District, which is a U.S. Registered Historic District.

Additionally, it is known as the geographic beneficiary of the jog in Michigan Avenue, which makes it visible along the Magnificent Mile as the building that seems to be in the middle of the road at the foot of this stretch of road (pictured at left). The building was designed by Holabird & Roche/Holabird & Root and completed in 1928. It is 396 feet (120.7 m) tall, and has 34 storeys.

It was designated a Chicago Landmark on February 7, 1997. It is located on the short quarter mile stretch of Michigan Avenue between the Chicago Landmark Historic Michigan Boulevard District and the Magnificent Mile. The building is managed and leased by MB Real Estate.

Designed by John Wellborn Root, Jr., the building's long and narrow footprint and towering structure are a tribute to Root's father John Wellborn Root's earlier Chicago Monadnock Building; Louis Sullivan's tall-building canon; and Eliel Saarinen's second-prize entry in the Tribune Tower design contest. The building was such a success that Holabird and Root took commercial residence there. The building's long and slender design optimized use of natural lighting. The building's interior represents Prohibition era modernism, especially its Art Deco Tavern club.

The building is embellished by a polished marble base, ornamental bands, and reliefs depicting frontiersmen and Native Americans at Fort Dearborn, which partially occupied the site.

Gallery

Notes

Skyscraper office buildings in Chicago
Office buildings completed in 1928
Art Deco architecture in Illinois
1928 establishments in Illinois
Projects by Holabird & Root
New Eastside